Brill Academic Publishers (known as E. J. Brill, Koninklijke Brill, Brill) is a Dutch international academic publisher founded in 1683 in Leiden, Netherlands. With offices in Leiden, Boston, Paderborn and Singapore, Brill today publishes 275 journals and around 1200 new books and reference works each year all of which are "subject to external, single or double-blind peer review." In addition, Brill provides of primary source materials online and on microform for researchers in the humanities and social sciences.

Areas of publication
Brill publishes in the following subject areas:

 Humanities:
 African Studies
 American Studies
 Ancient Near East and Egypt Studies
 Archaeology, Art & Architecture
 Asian Studies (Hotei Publishing and Global Oriental imprints)
 Classical Studies
 Education
 Jewish Studies
 Literature and Cultural Studies (under the Brill-Rodopi imprint)
 Media Studies
 Middle East and Islamic Studies
 Philosophy
 Religious Studies
 Slavic and Eurasian Studies
 Law (under the Brill-Nijhoff imprint):
 Human Rights and Humanitarian Law
 International Law
 International Relations
 Sciences:
 Biology
 Social Sciences
 Anthropology
 Cartography
 History
 Language and Linguistics
 Political Science
 Sociology
 Ecclesiology
 Biblical Studies and Early Christianity
Theology and World Christianity

History

Luchtmans, 1683–1848
The roots of Brill go back to 17 May 1683, when the Leiden booksellers' guild registered Jordaan Luchtmans as a bookseller. As was customary at the time, Luchtmans combined his bookselling business with publishing,  primarily in the fields of biblical studies, theology, Asian languages, and ethnography. Luchtmans established close ties with the University of Leiden, which was then a major center of study in these areas.

E. J. Brill, 1848–1896

In 1848, the business passed from the Luchtmans family to former employee E. J. (Evert Jan) Brill. In order to cover the financial obligations that he inherited, E. J. Brill liquidated the entire Luchtmans book stock in a series of auctions that took place between 1848 and 1850. Brill continued to publish in the traditional core areas of the company, with occasional excursions into other fields. Thus, in 1882, the firm brought out a two-volume  ("Handbook of Steam Engineering"). More programmatically, however, in 1855  ("The Lord's Prayer in Fourteen Languages") was meant to publicize Brill's ability to typeset non-Latin alphabets, including Hebrew, Aramaic, Samaritan, Sanskrit, Coptic, Syriac, and Arabic, among others.

Brill goes public, 1896–1945; World War II
In 1896, Brill became a public limited company, when E. J. Brill's successors, A. P. M. van Oordt and Frans de Stoppelaar, both businessmen with some academic background and interest, died. A series of directors followed, until Theunis Folkers took over the reins in 1934.  At the time, the annual turnover was 132,000 guilders.  His directorship marked a period of unprecedented growth in the history of the company, due to a large extent to Folkers' cooperation with the German occupying forces during World War II. For the Germans, Brill printed foreign-language textbooks so that they could manage the territories they occupied, but also military manuals, such as "a manual which trained German officers to distinguish the insignias of the Russian army". By 1943, the company's turnover had reached 579,000 guilders.

Brill's recent history, 1945–present
After the war, the Dutch denazification committee determined the presence of "enemy money" in Brill's accounts. Folkers was arrested in September 1946, and deprived of the right to hold a managerial post. The company itself, however, escaped the aftermath of the war relatively unscathed; after some negotiation its fines were fixed at 57,000 guilders.

Brill's path in the post-war years was again marked by ups and downs, though the company remained faithful in its commitment to scholarly publishing. The late 1980s brought an acute crisis due to over-expansion, poor management, as well as general changes in the publishing industry. Thus, in 1988–91 under new management the company underwent a major restructuring, in the course of which it closed some of its foreign offices, including Cologne. Its London branch was already closed by then. Brill, moreover, sold its printing business, which amounted "to amputat[ing] its own limb". This was considered painful, but necessary to save the company as a whole. No jobs were lost in the process. The reorganization saved the company, which has since expanded. As of 2008, Brill was publishing around 600 books and 100 journals each year, with a turnover of 26 million euros.

Martinus Nijhoff Publishers

In the 1970s and 80s it became well known as an independent international law publisher. It was acquired by Wolters Kluwer in the 1970s and subsequently by Brill Publishers. The name was changed to Brill–Nijhoff in 2013, and it is now an imprint of Brill Publishers. Nijhoff's portfolio focuses on areas in public international law, human rights, on humanitarian law and increasingly on international relations. Its annual publication program consists of over 20 academic journals, 20 annuals, and some 120 new book titles. Its back-list comprises over 2,000 titles.

Rodopi
Rodopi, founded in 1966 in Amsterdam, Netherlands, was an academic publishing company with offices in the Netherlands and the United States. It takes its name from a mountain range in Bulgaria which forms the border with northern Greece.

Rodopi publishes over 150 titles per year in around 70 peer-reviewed book series and journals. Rodopi publications are available in print and electronic formats. Although the main language of publication is English, the multilingual list includes German, French, and Spanish. The backlist contains around 4000 titles.  

On January 1, 2014, Rodopi was taken over by Brill.

Open access
Brill publishes several open access journals and is one of thirteen publishers to participate in the Knowledge Unlatched pilot, a global library consortium approach to funding open access books.

In 2013, Brill created the IFLA/Brill Open Access Award for initiatives in the area of open access monograph publishing together with the International Federation of Library Associations and Institutions.

Brill is a member of the Open Access Scholarly Publishers Association.

Brill Typeface
Brill has developed a commercial font, free for personal use, that supports most of the Latin, Greek and Cyrillic character ranges, including IPA and historical forms. It has better diacritic rendering than most pre-packaged computer fonts, though not complete IPA coverage.

See also
 List of Brill academic journals
 Books in the Netherlands
 Encyclopaedia of Islam - reference work published by Brill

Notes

References
 The most up-to-date history of the company is Sytze van der Veen, Brill: 325 Years of Scholarly Publishing (Leiden: Brill, 2008), 
 Verde, Tom. "Brill's Bridge to Arabic", Aramco World, 66 (May/June 2015), nr. 3, pp. 30–39. Archived version.

Further reading
 Ophuijsen, J.M. van. (1994). E. J. Brill, three centuries of scholarly publishing, since 1683. Leiden: Brill Publishers.

External links
 
 A list of books published by E. J. Brill Leiden
 Nijhoff online
 Brill | Nijhoff

1683 establishments in the Dutch Republic
Brill
Book publishing companies of the Netherlands
Companies established in 1683
Companies listed on Euronext Amsterdam
Companies based in Leiden
Mass media in Leiden
Publishing companies established in the 17th century